The 2002 Sunderland Council election took place on 2 May 2002 to elect members of Sunderland Metropolitan Borough Council in Tyne and Wear, England. One third of the council was up for election and the Labour Party stayed in overall control of the council.

After the election, the composition of the council was:
Labour 62
Conservative 11
Liberal Democrat 1
Liberal 1

Campaign
66 candidates contested the 25 seats that were available in the election. The election was said to be the "first time in recent memory" that every seat that was up for election was contested. Candidates included 6 from the British National Party and an independent, former Conservative group leader Ron Smith, in Pallion ward.

Postal voting in the election was up on the 2001 general election with 9,770 postal votes returned by 1 May, an increase of 3,500 on the general election.

Election result
The results saw Labour easily holding control of the council after losing just 1 seat in the election. The only change came in St Peter's ward with the Conservatives gaining the seat from Labour. Meanwhile, none of the British National Party candidates managed to win a seat, but the party did come second in 2 wards, Town End Farm and Southwick. The results meant Labour held 62 seats after the election, compared to 11 for the Conservatives.

Following the election the Labour leader of the council for the previous 3 years, Colin Anderson, was defeated in a leadership election by Bob Symonds.

Ward results

References

2002 English local elections
2002
21st century in Tyne and Wear